Albert Charles Blozis (January 5, 1919 – January 31, 1945) was an American football player and track and field athlete who died fighting in World War II. He played offensive tackle for the New York Giants in the National Football League (NFL)

Biography

Early life
Albert Charles Blozis, known as "Al", was born on January 5, 1919, in Garfield, New Jersey to Lithuanian immigrants. He attended William L. Dickinson High School in Jersey City, New Jersey, where he became well-known for his skill in the discus throw and shot put. At Georgetown University, he won AAU and NCAA indoor and outdoor shot titles three years in a row from 1940 to 1942. He had a best put of 57 feet, 3/4 inches (17.61 meters). In 2015, Blozis was inducted into the National Track and Field Hall of Fame.

Professional football career
Blozis was drafted in the fifth round of the 1942 NFL Draft and played offensive tackle for the New York Giants of the National Football League in 1942 and 1943 before entering the military. He was also able to play three games in 1944 while on furlough.

World War II and death
In a 1991 news story, The New York Times wrote, "Curiously, the very size that made him so intimidating on the football field kept him out of the military until late 1943, when, after repeated attempts, Blozis finally persuaded the Army to waive its size limit and accept him. It took further persuading to get from a desk job to the front lines."

Blozis was inducted into the United States Army on December 9, 1943. He was first assigned to duty as a physical instructor at Walter Reed General Hospital and then went through officer training at Fort Benning, where he set the army's hand-grenade-throwing record with a toss of 94 yards, 2 feet, 6.5 inches. He was commissioned as a second lieutenant in the 28th Infantry Division. On January 31, 1945, his platoon was in the Vosges Mountains of France scouting enemy lines. When two of his men, a sergeant and a private, failed to return from a patrol, he went in search of them alone. He never returned.

Blozis was first listed as missing, but in April 1945, his death was confirmed. His remains were buried at the Lorraine American Cemetery and Memorial in Saint-Avold, Moselle.

Honors
The New York Giants retired the number 32 that Blozis had worn. A second Giants player, Jack Lummus, also died in World War II.

In April 1946, True Comics featured a story about Blozis entitled The Human Howitzer.

The United States Army honored Blozis by naming an athletic center in Frankfurt, Germany after him. He was inducted into the College Football Hall of Fame in 1986.

An apartment building in Jersey City, Al Blozis Hall, is named in his honor.

See also

 Bob Kalsu – professional football player who enlisted in the US Army and was killed in action in Vietnam
 Pat Tillman – professional football player who enlisted in the US Army and was killed in action in Afghanistan

References

Further reading
 Victor Mastro and Frank Alkyer, et al., "Al Blozis: Jersey City Giant," The Coffin Corner, vol. 8, no. 6 (1986).
 "Two Giants Were Heroes Far From Playing Field; Al Blozis, a Star Tackle, and Jack Lummus, a Promising Receiver, Died in Combat in World War II", New York Times, January 26, 1991.

External links
 
 
 

1919 births
1945 deaths
American football tackles
American male discus throwers
American male shot putters
United States Army personnel killed in World War II
American people of Lithuanian descent
Burials at Lorraine American Cemetery and Memorial
College Football Hall of Fame inductees
Georgetown Hoyas football players
National Football League players with retired numbers
New York Giants players
People from Garfield, New Jersey
Players of American football from Jersey City, New Jersey
Sportspeople from Jersey City, New Jersey
William L. Dickinson High School alumni
United States Army officers
Military personnel from New Jersey
Missing in action of World War II